David Polonsky (born 1973) is an Israeli book illustrator and artistic film director.

His illustrations appeared in all major Israeli magazines and newspapers and illustrated many children's books, for which he received multiple awards. He also directed children's animated TV films. He taught illustration at the Bezalel Academy of Arts and Design.

In 2017, he and Ari Folman created a graphic novel adaptation of The Diary of Anne Frank.

In 2018 an English-language translation of The Heart-Shaped Leaf (written by Shira Geffen and illustrated by Polonsky) was published by Green Bean Books.

Filmography
2008: Waltz with Bashir, animated war documentary; made into a graphic novel by Folman and Polonsky
2013: The Congress
2021: Legend of Destruction

Awards
2004 Ben-Yitzhak Prize of the Israel Museum for Children's Books Illustration, Israel Museum, Jerusalem
2008 The Excellence Award of the Bezalel Academy of Art and Design in Jerusalem
2008 Ben-Yitzhak Prize of the Israel Museum for Children's Books Illustration, Israel Museum, Jerusalem
2008 The Ophir Prize of the Israeli Academy of Film and Television for artistic direction, for Waltz with Bashir
2008 Award for Decorations, Cinema Eye Honors, for Waltz with Bashir
2012 Andersen Prize for the Illustration of Children's Books, International Board on Books for Young People (IBBY), Basel, Switzerland.

References

External links
This Animated Life: An Interview with David Polonsky, about film and graphic novel Waltz With Bashir

1973 births
Living people